Allahlu (also Romanized as Allahlū; also known as Lalahlū) is a village in Arshaq Sharqi Rural District, in the Central District of Ardabil County, Ardabil Province, Iran. At the 2006 census, its population was 255, in 49 families.

References 

Towns and villages in Ardabil County